KSPN-FM is an adult album alternative radio station owned by Patricia MacDonald Garber and Peter Benedetti, through licensee AlwaysMountainTime, LLC, and broadcasts at 103.1 MHz FM in the Aspen, Colorado area. The station airs an adult album alternative format and uses the slogan "The Valley's Quality Rock".  With over 40 years of Quality Rock experience, this heritage station is the Roaring Fork Valley's favorite among both locals and tourists. KSPN covers all community and national events in the area: World Cup Championships, the 24 Hours of Aspen, Winterskol and Blitzenbanger. KSPN features the AAA format, which combines the classic rock hits from Tom Petty, Van Morrison and Talking Heads with today's newer musicians like Ben Harper, Blues Traveler, Sonia Dada and Widespread Panic.

KSPN-FM is rebroadcast on K247AD 97.3 MHz in Carbondale, Colorado, K252CU 98.3 MHz in Redstone, Colorado, and K261AK 100.1 MHz in Basalt, Colorado.

External links
 Official Website
 Corporate Website

SPN
Aspen, Colorado